This is a list of cities in South America.

Largest cities
This list includes all South American cities with a population within city limits exceeding 500,000 according to official census figures, estimates or projections as of 2015, the most recent year for which official population census results, estimates or short-term projections are available for all of these cities. These figures do not reflect the population of the urban agglomeration or metropolitan area which typically do not coincide with the administrative boundaries of the city. All figures refer to the mid-2015 population.

Countries
List of cities in Argentina
List of cities in Bolivia
List of cities in Brazil
List of cities in Chile
List of cities in Colombia
List of cities in Ecuador
List of cities in Guyana
List of cities in Paraguay
List of cities in Peru
List of cities in Suriname
List of cities in Uruguay
List of cities in Venezuela

Territories
List of cities in the Falkland Islands
List of cities in French Guiana

See also
List of Latin American cities by population
Demographics of South America
Lists of cities
Cities of present-day nations and states

Notes

References

 
Cities
South America
South America

Cities